Hervé Roche (born 24 December 1948) is a Venezuelan sailor. He competed in the Dragon event at the 1968 Summer Olympics.

References

External links
 

1948 births
Living people
Venezuelan male sailors (sport)
Olympic sailors of Venezuela
Sailors at the 1968 Summer Olympics – Dragon
Sportspeople from Bordeaux